La Couyère is a commune in the Ille-et-Vilaine department of Brittany in northwestern France.

The commune is home to a small Solar System model established in 2011.

Population
Inhabitants of La Couyère are called in French coverois.

See also
Communes of the Ille-et-Vilaine department

References

External links

Mayors of Ille-et-Vilaine Association 

Communes of Ille-et-Vilaine